Tik-Tok of Oz is the eighth Land of Oz book written by L. Frank Baum, published on June 19, 1914. The book has little to do with Tik-Tok and is primarily the quest of the Shaggy Man (introduced in The Road to Oz) to rescue his brother, and his resulting conflict with the Nome King.

The endpapers of the first edition held maps:  one of Oz itself, and one of the continent on which Oz and its neighboring countries belonged.  These were the first maps printed of Oz.

Plot summary
Queen Ann Soforth of Oogaboo, a small monarchy separated from the rest of Oz's Winkie Country, sets out to raise an army to conquer Oz. Seventeen men eventually make up the Army of Oogaboo (sixteen officers and one private); they march out of their valley. Glinda the Good, protector of Oz, magically rearranges the path through the mountains and Queen Ann and her army march out of Oz into a low-lying, befogged country.

Betsy Bobbin, a girl who is a year older than Dorothy Gale, and her loyal mule Hank have washed ashore during a storm. They arrive at a large greenhouse that is the domain of the Rose Kingdom, where the roses tell them that no strangers are allowed. Just as the Royal Gardener (apparently the only human allowed in this flowery kingdom) is about to pass sentence on Betsy and Hank, the Shaggy Man falls through the greenhouse's roof, and charms the Gardener into sparing all of their lives with his Love Magnet. The flowers, not having hearts, are unaffected by the Magnet, and force the travelers to leave, taking with them the newly plucked Rose Princess Ozga, a cousin of Ozma, the ruler of Oz.

The Shaggy Man relates how Ozma sent him here via the Magic Belt because he wanted to find his brother, who went digging underground in Colorado and disappeared. He surmised that the Nome King, ruler of the underground Nome Kingdom, captured him. They meet up with Polychrome the Rainbow's Daughter, and they rescue Tik-Tok from the well where the Nome King had tossed him. Once Tik-Tok is wound up, he accompanies Betsy, Hank, the Shaggy Man, Ozga, and Polychrome to their chance encounter with Queen Ann and her army. In a rage, Queen Ann orders them to be seized and bound, but Private Files — the only private in this army of generals, colonels, and majors — refuses to bind innocent girls. He resigns his commission on the spot. When Queen Ann learns of the riches to be found in the Nome King's underground kingdom, she calms down and accepts the services of Tik-Tok as her new private.

The Nome King (who has recovered from having drunk the Water of Oblivion in The Emerald City of Oz) is aghast at this group coming toward his underground kingdom. Since no one can be killed in Oz, the Nome King seeks to discourage them, first by taking them through the Rubber Country, and then disposing of them by dropping them through the Hollow Tube, a conduit leading to the other side of the world.

There the party enters the jurisdiction of the immortal called Tititi-Hoochoo, the Great Jinjin, who vows to punish the Nome King for using the Hollow Tube. He sends Tik-Tok and the others back with his Instrument of Vengeance, a lackadaisical dragon named Quox. Quox and his riders bound from the other end of the Tube into an army of Nomes and narrowly evade them. Queen Ann and the Army of Oogaboo fall into the Slimy Cave when they enter the Nome Kingdom; the Shaggy Man and his companions are captured by the Nome King. Ann and her army escape the cave while the Nome King amuses himself by transforming his captives into various objects. Quox arrives, bursting through the main cavern. The Nome King sees the ribbon around Quox's neck and forgets all the magic he ever knew. The Nome King is driven out of his kingdom when Quox releases six eggs from the padlock around his neck. The eggs, poisonous to Nomes, follow the Nome King to the Earth's surface and confine him there.

The new Nome King, the former chief steward Kaliko, vows to help the Shaggy Man find his brother, whom he knows is in the Metal Forest. The Shaggy Man meets his brother in the center of the Forest, but the brother was cursed with a charm of ugliness by the former Nome King. A kiss will break a charm. First Betsy, a mortal maid, tries to undo the spell, then Ozga, a mortal maid who was once a fairy. Finally, it's the fairy Polychrome's kiss that restores the Shaggy Man's brother to his former self.

There is a banquet of rejoicing in the Nome Kingdom, and the former Nome King earnestly pleads to be let back into the underground lair ("No Nome can really be happy except underground"), which Kaliko allows on condition that he behave himself. Once on the surface again, Polychrome ascends her rainbow and Ozma uses the magic belt to bring Tik-Tok back to Oz and send Queen Ann, the Army of Oogaboo, Files, and Ozga back to Oogaboo. The Shaggy Man only agrees to return when his brother, Betsy, and Hank are allowed to enter Oz too.

Upon being welcomed in Oz, Hank, the Cowardly Lion, the Hungry Tiger, and the Saw-Horse debate who is the best mistress — Betsy (for Hank), Dorothy (for the Lion and the Tiger), or Ozma (for the Saw-Horse). The three girls are listening and laugh at a silly quarrel, which the animals realize is silly too. In addition, Dorothy finally gets to hear her dog Toto speak — for all animals can in the Land of Oz. Finally, Betsy decides to stay in Oz forever.

Commentary
In 1913, Baum's long-delayed and heavily-adapted stage version of Ozma of Oz, re-titled The Tik-Tok Man of Oz, was produced in Los Angeles, with moderate success. The music was composed by Louis F. Gottschalk, Baum's favorite composer, who would also be the dedicatee of the Tik-Tok novel a year later. Baum adapted some of the material from the stage production for the novel.  As in Ozma of Oz, a shipwreck precipitates the heroine into her adventure, and the quest of the Shaggy Man for his brother, who was named Wiggy in the play, is another attempt to rescue a prisoner of the Nome King.  The picking of Ozga is a motif found in Dorothy and the Wizard in Oz.

The book has several continuity errors with earlier books in the series, particularly The Road to Oz. Whereas Polychrome met the Shaggy Man in that book, this point is neglected by Baum in Tik-Tok. Also, whereas the Shaggy Man merely needs to carry the Love Magnet on his person for it to work in The Road to Oz, in this book it is necessary for him to remove it from his pocket and physically show it to those he wishes to love him.

Tik-Tok of Oz was more modestly produced than earlier Oz books, with twelve color plates instead of sixteen. Its first edition sold a little over 14,000 copies — a respectable figure, but 3,000 fewer than The Patchwork Girl of Oz had done the year before. Baum's books were facing stiff new competition — from his own earlier books. The reprint house M. A. Donohue & Co. had purchased the rights to several early Baum works from Bobbs-Merrill, and was marketing cut-rate editions. People were less willing to pay the usual $1.25 for a new Oz book when the original Wizard of Oz was selling for $0.35.

Tik-Tok of Oz also contained the first map of Oz and its neighboring countries, which proved to be a very popular feature. Unfortunately for the principle of consistency, this initial map of Oz was drawn backwards, with the Munchkin Country in the left and the Winkie Country in the right, with the compass rose reversed to keep the Munchkin Country in the east and the Winkie Country in the west. [See: Land of Oz.]  Subsequent maps from the publisher "corrected" the compass rose, but not the locations.  This may explain why Ruth Plumly Thompson reversed the locations from Baum's -- in her books the Munchkin country is west; and her Winkies East (see for instance Ozoplaning with the Wizard of Oz but also in several other books).  James E. Haff and Dick Martin ultimately corrected these in new maps designed for The International Wizard of Oz Club.  A squarish map that largely follows Haff and Martin appears in The Dictionary of Imaginary Places.  The presence of a "Davy Jones Island" on this map indicates that the inclusion of the character Davy Jones, a wooden whale, as a decoration on the map, was misinterpreted by the book's recartographers, as no such place appears in any Oz books up to that book's publication.

The 1993 novel Queen Ann in Oz is a sequel to Tik-Tok of Oz.

References

External links

 
Tik-Tok of Oz PDF from the internet archive
 

Oz (franchise) books
1914 American novels
1914 fantasy novels
Sequel novels
1914 children's books